Józef Manowski (born 7 January 1935), is a Polish former ice hockey player. He played for AZS Warszawa and Legia Warsaw during his career. With Legia he won the Polish league championship five times, and was the league's top goal scorer in 1963, 1964, and 1966He also played for the Polish national team at the 1964 Winter Olympics and four World Championship.

References

External links
 

1935 births
Living people
AZS Warszawa (ice hockey) players
Ice hockey players at the 1964 Winter Olympics
Legia Warsaw (ice hockey) players
Olympic ice hockey players of Poland
Sportspeople from Masovian Voivodeship
People from Ostrów Mazowiecka County
Polish ice hockey right wingers